Ujangsan Station is a station on the Seoul Subway Line 5 in Gangseo-gu, Seoul. It is named after a nearby mountain to the east.

This station is notable for being the first one operated by Seoul Metro to have platform screen doors.

Station layout

Vicinity
Exit 1 : Ujangsan Park, Naebalsan Elementary School
Exit 2 : Korea Polytechnic College (Gangseo Campus)
Exit 3 : Hwagok Middle & High Schools
Exit 4 : Balsan Elementary School

See also

References

Railway stations opened in 1996
Seoul Metropolitan Subway stations
Metro stations in Gangseo District, Seoul
1996 establishments in South Korea
20th-century architecture in South Korea